Sabon Gari Local Government is a local government area in Kaduna State, Nigeria. It is one of the local government areas  in the Zaria metropolis as well as being one of the districts of the Zazzau Emirate Council. The towns and villages are Dogarawa, Bomo, Basawa, Zabi, Samaru, Kwari, Barashi, Muchiya and Palladan. The Local Government council is chaired by Alhaji Mohammed Usman.

Population 
Sabon Gari local Government area is densely populated with estimation of 204,562 population. The towns hosted different members of diverse ethnic affiliations. The major language used is Hausa language while Islam and Christianity are the religions practiced among people in the area.

Geography 
The average temperature is 32 °C, with two major seasons which are dry and rainy season.

Economy 

Trading is the key economic activities of Sabon Gari, with the area hosting several markets incorporating the Samaru and Sabon Gari main markets which attracts thousands of customers buying and selling. It's a home for students and academic activities with also vibrants agricultural activities.

References 

Local Government Areas in Kaduna State